Edens Zero is an anime series is based on the manga series of the same name, written and illustrated by Hiro Mashima. On June 12, 2020, Mashima announced on Twitter that the manga would be adapted into an anime television series. At the Tokyo Game Show livestream on September 26, 2020, it was revealed that the anime would be produced by J.C.Staff and directed by Yūshi Suzuki, with Shinji Ishihira serving as chief director, Mitsutaka Hirota overseeing scripts, Yurika Sako designing the characters, and Yoshihisa Hirano composing the music. The first season aired on Nippon TV and other channels from April 11 to October 3, 2021, and was Suzuki's sole directorial work prior to his death on September 9, 2021.

Netflix acquired streaming rights to the series, globally releasing the first twelve episodes outside Japan on August 26, 2021, and the remaining thirteen episodes on November 24 the same year.

On February 9, 2022, it was announced that the series would receive a second season. It is scheduled to premiere in April 1, 2023, with Toshinori Watanabe replacing Suzuki as the director.


Series overview

Episode list

Season 1 (2021)

Season 2 (2023)

Home media release

Notes

References

Edens Zero